Unitarian Universalism, the Unitarian Universalist Association (UUA), and the Canadian Unitarian Council (CUC), as Non-Creedal and Liberal theological traditions, is an LGBTQ affirming denomination.

The full participation of laypeople and the ordination of lesbian, gay, bisexual and/or transgender (LGBT) people who are open about their sexuality or gender identity; are sexually active if lesbian, gay, or bisexual; or are in same-sex relationships are permitted and welcomed by Unitarian Universalist organizations.

Theology 
The first of Unitarian Universalism's seven principles is the belief in "the inherent worth and dignity of every person", which is frequently cited as the faith's justification for their views of LGBTQ individuals.

History
Unitarianism and Universalism, two religious movements that merged in 1961 to form Unitarian Universalism, had a long history of reform of social institutions and were a home for many abolitionists, feminists, and other forward thinkers, including gay liberationists. For example, one of the founders of the Mattachine Foundation was a gay Universalist minister, Rev. Wallace de Ortega Maxey (pastor of the First Universalist Church of Los Angeles), and two of the founders of the Mattachine Society—Bob Hull and Chuck Rowland—were also Universalists.

The annual general assembly of the UUA has passed more than two dozen resolutions on LGBTQ issues, including same-sex marriage, LGB people in the military, the Employment Nondiscrimination Act, and transgender rights.

In 1970, Unitarian Universalism was the first religion to officially condemn discrimination against homosexuals. The resolution condemned biphobia as well as homophobia. 

In 1989, the UUA launched a Welcoming Congregation Program to support churches in intentionally becoming more inclusive of LGBTQ people. After meeting requirements related to church policy, education, advocacy, and more, congregations are designated as Welcoming Congregations. As of 2019, 75% of all U.S. Unitarian Universalist congregations and 99% of all Canadian Unitarian Universalist congregations had gone through the process of becoming Welcoming Congregations.

Ordination of LGBTQ clergy 
In September 1969, Rev. James L. Stoll publicly came out as gay, making him the first ordained minister of a major religious group in the United States or Canada to do so. The denomination ordained its first openly gay minister in 1979, and its first openly transgender minister was ordained in 1988.

Education 
In 1971, the Unitarian Universalist Association published About Your Sexuality, a comprehensive sex education program for teenagers in Unitarian Universalist churches that treated homosexuality as a valid and normal form of sexuality. The program was revised a number of times over the next several decades and in 1999 was replaced with Our Whole Lives, a joint program with the United Church of Christ that continues to affirm LGBTQ identities in its curricula.

Same-sex marriage 
The first documented same-sex weddings conducted by Unitarian Universalist ministers were performed by Rev. Ernest Pipes Jr., at the Community Church of Santa Monica, California, in 1957, and Rev. Harry Barron Scholefield, at the First Unitarian Church of San Francisco, in 1958.  

The UUA has officially supported Unitarian Universalist clergy performing services of union for same-sex couples since 1984. Seven of the fourteen plaintiffs in Goodridge v. Department of Public Health, the case that legalized same-sex marriage in Massachusetts, were Unitarian Universalists. The denomination was very active in the fight for marriage equality in the United States through its advocacy campaign Side With Love (formerly Standing on the Side of Love). The UUA submitted an amicus currie brief in support of same-sex marriage for Obergefell v. Hodges, the Supreme Court case which legalized same-sex marriage nationwide.

Transgender rights 
IN 2022 the UUA submitted an amicus brief decrying Alabama's SB 184 bill, which criminalized gender-affirming healthcare for transgender youth.

Instituted organizations

UUA 
The UUA has dedicated staff becoming more welcoming and inclusive of LGBTQ people since 1973 through an office now called LGBTQ Ministries, making it the first major national religious organization to open an office in support of civil rights and social acceptance of LGBTQ people. The office of LGBTQ Ministries administers the Welcoming Congregation Program through which UU churches take action to increase their inclusion of LGBTQ people.

United Nations Office 
Known as UUA-UNO for short, the UUA's United Nations Office has advocated for LGBT rights in countries outside of the United States. They have also provided educational resources to some LGBT communities in Africa.

Canadian
The Canadian Unitarian Council similarly supports the Welcoming Congregation Program and recognizes Welcoming Congregations. The first same-sex marriage performed by a church in Canada (after the 1972 civil same-sex marriage of Michel Girouard and Rejean Tremblay of Montreal) was that of Chris Vogel and Richard North, married by the First Unitarian Universalist Church of Winnipeg on February 11, 1974, officiated by Unitarian minister Rev. Norm Naylor. Unitarian Universalists were responsible for the first same-sex marriages performed in Manitoba, Ontario, Alberta, British Columbia, Nova Scotia, and Saskatchewan, mostly in the 1970s, although the provincial governments often refused to recognize the marriages at the time.

International Council of Unitarians and Universalists 
The International Council of Unitarians and Universalists has helped advocate for LGBT rights in Nigeria and Kenya.

Interweave
From 1993 until 2016, there was a fellowship of LGBT Unitarian Universalists and supporters called Interweave Continental. Interweave was a related organization of the UUA, actively working to end oppression based on sexual orientation and gender identity. Sometimes, an individual church's Welcoming Congregation Committee evolved into an Interweave Chapter. Each chapter requested financial and advocacy support from the fellowship with which it is connected.

TRUUsT
Founded in 2004, TRUUsT (Transgender Religious Professional Unitarian Universalists Together) is an organization of trans Unitarian Universalist ministers, religious educators, seminarians, and other leaders.

Local activism

Africa 
The Unitarian Universalist church in Kampala, led by Mark Kiyamba, has been working since 2009 to support LGBTQ individuals in Uganda. Unitarian Universalist communities in Burundi and South Africa have also been vocally supportive of LGBTQ rights.

United States 
The Unitarian Universalist Society of Iowa City hosted the city's Lesbian Alliance in the 1970s and same-sex marriage activists in 2009.

In the 1980s All Souls Unitarian Church in Tulsa, Oklahoma, hosted the group that would become Oklahomans for Equality.

Individual American churches have hosted and supported Pride events, including inclusive services and LGBTQ proms.

Individual ministers and congregants have shown support for LGBTQ rights and transgender rights at protests.

See also

References

Unitarian Universalism
Unitarian Universalism